There are three species of amphibians native to Ireland.

Subclass: Lissamphibia

Superorder: Salientia

Order: Anura
Suborder: Neobatrachia
Family: Ranidae
Genus: Rana
 European common brown frog (Rana temporaria) 
Family: Bufonidae
Genus: Epidalea
 Natterjack toad (Epidalea calamita)

Order: Caudata
Suborder: Salamandroidea
Family: Salamandridae
Genus: Lissotriton
 Smooth newt (Lissotriton vulgaris vulgaris)

External links
"Republic of Ireland: Amphibians". Thomson Ecology. Archived 1 May 2005.
King, J. L.; Marnell, F.; Kingston, N.; Rosell, R.; Boylan, P.; Caffrey, J. M.; FitzPatrick, Ú.; Gargan, P. G.; Kelly, F. L.; O'Grady, M. F.; Poole, R.; Roche, W. K. & Cassidy, D. (2011). Ireland Red List No. 5: Amphibians, Reptiles & Freshwater Fish. National Parks and Wildlife Service, Department of Arts, Heritage and the Gaeltacht, Dublin, Ireland.

Ireland
Amphibians
Ireland
Amphibians